Alex Lanier (born 26 January 2005) is a French badminton player.

Career 
Alex Lanier started playing badminton at the age of 3 and later joined the Dives-sur-Mer badminton club. In 2019, he left the Dives-sur-Mer, to join the club of Strasbourg, to compete in the French interclub division. In 2020, he joined INSEP at the age of only 15.

In June 2021, he competed in the Lithuanian International tournament and won his first international title in the final by defeating Canada's player B. R. Sankeerth. Afterwards, he managed to advance to the final at the Latvia International, but lost to India's Meiraba Luwang Maisnam. He bounced back at the Italian International and won his second international title by defeating Czech player Jan Louda.

In 2022, he clinched the boys' singles title at the European Junior Championships. In October, he secured his first win on a World Tour event at the age of only 17, as he defeated Japanese Takuma Obayashi at the Canada Open.

Achievements

European Junior Championships 
Boys' singles

BWF World Tour (1 title)
The BWF World Tour, which was announced on 19 March 2017 and implemented in 2018, is a series of elite badminton tournaments sanctioned by the Badminton World Federation (BWF). The BWF World Tour is divided into levels of World Tour Finals, Super 1000, Super 750, Super 500, Super 300, and the BWF Tour Super 100.

Men's singles

BWF International Challenge/Series (3 titles, 2 runners-up) 
Men's singles

 BWF International Series tournament
 BWF Future Series tournament

References

External links 

2005 births
Living people
Sportspeople from Caen
French male badminton players
21st-century French people